Kaspars Stupelis (born 7 July 1982) is a Latvian sidecarcross passenger and quadruple World Champion.

Stupelis won the 2015 and 2019 World Championship as passenger of Etienne Bax. His previous two world championships were gained when being the passenger in Daniël Willemsen's team. In his time with Willemsen, he also won two Dutch titles in 2003 and 2004, an achievement repeated at the side of Bax in 2012, 2014 and 2015.

Sidecarcross world championship results
Kaspars Stupelis entered the sidecarcross world championship as a passenger for his fellow Latvian driver Modris Štelle in 2001. His first two seasons alongside Štelle were not particularly successful and it came as a surprise when the reigning world champion, Daniël Willemsen, picked him as his passenger for the 2003 season. The team was successful from the start, winning the first race of the season in Talavera de la Reina, Spain on 6 April 2003.

It was Stupelis first race victory and he gained another 30 in this and the next season with Willemsen, winning two world titles in the process. Willemsen, who has exchanged passengers frequently over the years, did something of a swoop with Kristers Serģis after the 2004 season, with Stupelis joining his fellow Latvian former world champion and, in exchange, Sven Verbrugge from Belgium joining Willemsen from Serģis. The new pair Serģis / Stupelis finished second in the final standings in 2005, winning seven races.

2006 was not a good year for the combination and they only raced in two events, failing to win any of the four races they participated but achieving three podium finishes. In 2007, they were back, won their home GP and finished third overall, becoming the only team to snatch a victory from the world champion Willemsen. The duo continued to race and took part in the 2008 season, which was Serģis last.

In 2009, Kaspars Stupelis was racing as passenger of Nicky Pulinx in the world championship, in 2010 he raced with fellow Latvian Maris Rupeiks. He missed the first two events of the 2011 season, being replaced by Elvis Mucenieks, but raced the remaining eleven Grand Prix with Rupeiks again. He had a much improved 2012 season on the side of Etienne Bax, finishing second in the world championship, only five points behind winners Daniël Willemsen. In 2013 the team Bax/Stupelis came second once more in the world championship, this time finishing 97 points behind Ben Adriaenssen and Ben van den Bogaart. Stupelis and Bax finished second in the World Championship for a third consecutive time in 2014, 18 points behind  Adriaenssen and van den Bogaart.

Stupelis and Bax won the 2015 World Championship in the second-last event of the season. After the end of the season it was announced that Stupelis would not race with Bax in 2016 as the latter would switch to his younger brother Robbie Bax as his passenger.

As Willemsens passenger, he has also won two Dutch national titles, in 2003 and 2004. In 2012, 2014 and 2015, now with Etienne Bax, he won three more national titles in the Netherlands.

Season by season

Source:
 Passengers in italics.

Honours

World Championship
 Champions: (4) 2003, 2004, 2015, 2019
 Runners-up: (5) 2005, 2008, 2012, 2013, 2014

Netherlands
 Champions: (5) 2003, 2004, 2012, 2014, 2015, 2018

References

External links

 Kristers Serģis homepage 
 The World Championship on Sidecarcross.com

1982 births
Living people
Latvian sidecarcross riders